Rotherham Metropolitan Borough Council elections took place on Thursday 5 May 2016, alongside nationwide local elections. All 63 seats were up for election, 3 seats from each of the 21 wards.

This result has the following consequences for the total number of seats on the council after the elections:

Ward results
 Incumbent*

Anston and Woodsetts

Boston Castle

Brinsworth and Catcliffe

Dinnington

Hellaby

Holderness

Hoober

Keppel

Maltby

Rawmarsh

Rother Vale

Rotherham East

Rotherham West

Silverwood

Sitwell

Swinton

Valley

Wales

Wath

Wickersley

Wingfield

References

2016 English local elections
2016
2010s in South Yorkshire